Goddess of the Sea is a sculpture by Kristen Visbal, installed in Plyler Park, Myrtle Beach, South Carolina, United States on April 18, 2018. The bronze sculpture depicts a mermaid and two dolphins in water.

See also

 Mermaids in popular culture

References

2018 establishments in South Carolina
2018 sculptures
Bronze sculptures in South Carolina
Buildings and structures in Myrtle Beach, South Carolina
Dolphins in art
Marine art
Mermaids in popular culture
Outdoor sculptures in South Carolina
Sculptures of mermaids
Sculptures of mythology
Sculptures of women in the United States
Statues in South Carolina
Water in art